Jon Clarke (born 4 April 1979) is an English former professional rugby league player who played as a . He is currently a strength & conditioning coach for the England and British & Irish Lions rugby union teams. He played for the Wigan Warriors, London Broncos, Warrington Wolves and Widnes Vikings.

Playing career
He represented Great Britain Academy as captain whilst coming through the junior ranks at Wigan Warriors, he played in their 1997 Premiership Final winning side against St. Helens.

Generally used as Warrington Wolves' starting , he was Super League's most effective tackler in 2004 with a 99% success rate, and was fourth highest tackler in the competition in 2005.

In June 2007, Clarke was called up to the Great Britain squad for the Test match against France.

The Warrington Wolves fans voted him 'Greatest Hooker' in the club's history, beating John Thursfield and Mark Roskell into 2nd and 3rd place.

He was forced to rule himself out contention for the England training squad for the 2008 Rugby League World Cup through injury.

Clarke played in the 2010 Challenge Cup Final victory over the Leeds Rhinos at Wembley Stadium.

It was announced on 6 September 2011 that Clarke would be joining Widnes Vikings in their forthcoming return to Super League.

Coaching career
Clarke retired at the end of the 2014 season, and joined the coaching staff at Widnes.

Clarke was on the coaching staff of England RU at the 2019 Rugby World Cup in Japan. He was a strength and conditioning coach on the 2021 British & Irish Lions tour to South Africa.

References

External links
!Great Britain Statistics at englandrl.co.uk (statistics currently missing due to not having appeared for both Great Britain, and England)
Profile at warringtonwolves.com

1979 births
Living people
Alumni of the University of Chester
English rugby league players
Great Britain national rugby league team players
London Broncos players
People from Lowton
Rugby league hookers
Rugby league players from Leigh, Greater Manchester
Warrington Wolves players
Wigan Warriors players